Carl Bengtström (born 13 January 2000) is a Swedish athlete in the 400 metres and 400 metres hurdles. He represented his country at the 2021 European Indoor Championships finishing fourth in the final and narrowly missing a medal. He got bronze medals at the 2022 World Indoor Championships and the 2023 European Indoor Championships. He earlier won a gold medal at the 2019 European U20 Championships.

International competitions

Personal bests
Outdoor
100 metres – 10.70 (-0.9 m/s, Skara 2021)
200 metres – 20.95 (-1.1 m/s, Linköping 2021)
400 metres – 45.98 (Stockholm 2021)
800 metres – 1:51.85 (Gothenburg 2020)
400 metres hurdles – 48.53 (Bellinzona 2021)
Indoor
60 metres – 6.88 (Gothenburg 2021)
400 metres – 45.33 (Belgrade 2022)

References

2000 births
Living people
Swedish male sprinters
Swedish male hurdlers
Örgryte IS Friidrott athletes
World Athletics Indoor Championships medalists
21st-century Swedish people